The Bristow Hotel is a historic commercial building in 112 South 2nd Street in Ozark, Arkansas.  It is a two-story stone structure, finished in rusticated ashlar limestone.  It was built in 1909 for George Bristow, a local resident, and has retained many of its internal finishes despite conversion to professional offices.  The building is one of the few built in Ozark out of local limestone.

The building was listed on the National Register of Historic Places in 1999.

See also
National Register of Historic Places listings in Franklin County, Arkansas

References

Hotel buildings on the National Register of Historic Places in Arkansas
Buildings designated early commercial in the National Register of Historic Places in Arkansas
Commercial buildings completed in 1909
Buildings and structures in Franklin County, Arkansas
National Register of Historic Places in Franklin County, Arkansas
Historic district contributing properties in Arkansas